Mere Humsafar is a Pakistani drama television series produced by Humayun Saeed and Shehzad Naseeb under banner Six Sigma Plus,  directed by Qasim Ali  Mureed and first aired on 30 December 2021 to 3 October 2022 on ARY Digital. It stars Farhan Saeed and Hania Aamir in leads along with Saba Hameed, Waseem Abbas, Samina Ahmad, Zoya Nasir, Hira Umer and Tara Mahmood in supporting roles.

Mere Humsafar revolves around a girl, Hala, who is left by her father at her paternal house where she is mistreated. Later, her cousin returns from abroad and marries her and gives her the respect she always needed. Hala was mistreated by her Tai Jan (paternal aunt/uncle's wife) her whole life. Her cousin (and now husband) Hamza gave her respect and love.

The series is highly rated and gained popularity in Pakistan, India, Bangladesh and Nepal.

Plot 

Hala a British-Pakistani girl is left alone in Pakistan at a young age by her father, Nafees, because his new European wife does not want to raise his daughter from his previous marriage. Loved by her father and then abandoned, Hala is mistreated by her father's elder brother, Raees, his wife, Shahjahan and other brother Jalees's wife, Sofia. She grows up to be an innocent teenager who is always abused and the slightest ease she had in the family was her grandmother and younger uncle, Jalees. Raees narrates her father false stories about her and never lets her talk to her father. She is in love with her best friend, Shafaq's cousin, Khurram, who takes her on a few dates secretly. Shahjahan discovers this and creates misunderstandings by narrating false narratives to Khurram. Khurram's mother falls severely ill on discovering her son had been deceiving the family and Hala as he was engaged to Shafaq, but Khurram blames Hala instead of seeing his own fault. Raees plans on getting Hala married to his employee Naveed, who is mentally unstable. Later, Hala's cousin Hamza breaks off her marriage saying how would she live with such a man. After the scene, for a mistake committed by Hamza's younger sister Rumi that leads to Sameen being attacked by goons, ShahJahan, in order to save her daughter, says everything has been done by Hala and throws her out of the house. When later Hamza finds Hala on roads, he brings her home to which Raees opposes and keeps a condition to Hala, to live at their home she needs to be a relative of the family and denies her entry as they say her own father has ended the relationship with her. While Hala is left with no choice Hamza does the unthinkable, taking Hala to the mosque and marrying her! The others are upset from the marriage since it was decided at a young age that Hamza will be marrying Sameen when they grow up. Sameen is now heartbroken about Hamza marrying Hala. This is when Shahjahan (Taijaan's) hatred toward Hala grows even more. Accusing Hala that she brainwashed her son (Hamza) into falling in love.

Hala's life becomes harder living there as no one accepts her as Hamza's wife except grandmother. While overcoming the hatred and hardships there, Hamza helps her find confidence in herself. They begin to fall for each other. While Khurram saves Sameen's life and both bump into each other multiple times, they grow a friendship with each other. One day Sameen takes Khurram to her house, where he realises that it is Hala's house as he had gone there before and sees her and Hamza together from behind the bushes and vows to take a revenge on her. It is soon revealed that Hala is pregnant and will not be able to travel to London. After knowing of Hala's pregnancy, grandmother and Hamza are over the moon and the others are less than happy. Shahjahan, seeing Hala's importance grow because of her unborn child, decides to make Hala miscarry her child. In order to do that, she gives her a pain medicine and Hala, thinking Shahjahan has changed, eats the medicine. Afterwards when the truth is revealed to Hala, she confronts Shahjahan about it with Hamza and Shahjahan denies it shows it as if Hala takes it herself to abort her pregnancy. After this, Hala and Hamza fight a lot and are upset with each other. Now Sameen's parents are thinking to marry Khurram and Sameen, and in that purpose call Khurram to their house to finalize the proposal. Shahjahan sees Khurram and recognizes him blurting out about Khurram and Hala's past to which everyone is shocked. She calls Hala and drags her in front of everyone and then Khurram ironically refuses to recognise Hala, and even Hala under pressure lied that she also doesn't know him framing Shahjahan as the liar and mental one. Everyone says that she has gone insane. Hala is deeply traumatized by this and as she always speaks the truth, and she told a lie she cries a lot. Hamza comforts her but still she doesn't get okay. For few days Khurram and Shahjahan traumatize Hala. Hala decides to tell Hamza about the past, but Shahjahan doesn't let that happen. A day before Khurram's engagement, he recalls his mother's words and decides to give up on revenge. The next day it's Khurram's engagement with Sameen. Shahjahan is disturbed by this and asks Khurram to back off from engagement, but he does not. And he also says Shahjahan that he does not want to take any revenge. On this Shahjahan gets angry and comes up with an evil plan. She manipulates Hala and takes her to Khurram's house and asks her to request him to go away from Sameen's life. While Hala is talking to Khurram, Shahjahan calls Hamza and asks him to come to Khurram's house and asks him to listen their conversation in a sneaky way. Hamza misunderstands the situation and Hala's words. He feels broken. Everyone in the family discovers that Hala knew Khurram much earlier. Meanwhile, Nafees (Hala's father) comes back with his other daughter Maryam. Grandmother dies while narrating Hala's painful experiences in life. The engagement of Sameen and Khurram is broken off after knowing the truth. Nafees and Maryam support Hala and make her regain her self-confidence. Hamza despite Hala leaving the house comes treats her nicely. One day Khurram goes to Sameen and apologizes for his mistake and Sameen says he should first take forgiveness from Hala, so Khurram came to Hala for apology and Hamza sees them together and feels suspicious. Meanwhile Rumi also marries her boyfriend secretly as her mother had refused to talk about her marriage with her father. Later Shahjahan came to Hala and told her that Hamza will expel her after taking child from her which upsets her and makes her doubt Hamza. Hala and Hamza have a fight and feel betrayed by each other and do not want to live together and Hamza goes to Khurram's house to tell him about their split. Khurram makes Hamza realize his love for Hala. Meanwhile Rumi's engagement is being done with someone else and Hala has an appointment simultaneously, so Hamza accompanies Hala to the hospital. Meanwhile Sameen plans to go to study abroad, and her father Jalees decides to sell his share of house to fund Sameen's education. When Hala discovers Rumi crying on the streets and helps her and Hamza in resolving Rumi's secret marriage issue, Hamza tries to get back with her. Hala falls sick on learning that Hamza tried to offer her hand to Khurram and delivers their baby girl. On returning home, Rumi reveals Shahjahan's false blames and Hamza decides to go to Australia with Hala and their daughter for a fresh start. Jalees was unhappy but accepted the decision while Hala wanted to stay in Pakistan. Shahjahan broke down after learning about it and she started to ask forgiveness to both of them, requesting them to stay. Rumi is married to her boyfriend Waqas formally and Khurram says he will wait for Sameen after she comes back from abroad. The story ended with Hala forgiving Shajahan and Hala Hamza confessing their love to each other over a cup of tea. Hala convinces Hamza to remain in Pakistan to look after their child and the family.

Cast

Main 
 Farhan Saeed as Hamza Raees Ahmed, works hard developing his new business after returning from Australia, completing his higher studies; Raees and ShahJahan's son, Rifat's grandson, Roomi's brother, Nafees' nephew and son-in-law, Jalees' nephew, Sameen's former love interest and cousin; Maryam, Abraham and Musa's cousin and brother-in-law; Hala's cousin and husband, who supported and married Hala, when she was thrown out of house by his mother. (2022)
 Hania Amir as Hala Hamza Ahmed (née Hala Nafees Ahmed), Nafees' left British-National daughter from his first marriage, Maryam, Abraham and Musa's half-sister, Rifat's granddaughter, Raees and ShahJahan's daughter-in-law , Raees and Jalees' niece, Hamza, Sameen and Roomi's cousin, Roomi's sister-in-law, Hamza's wife; she was disliked by her aunts, ShahJahan and Sofia as she was left by her father at their home and used to punish her on her silly mistakes. She was loved and supported by Rifat, Jalees, and Shafaq (her best friend) and Hamza. (2022)
 Hoorain Lyka Ali as Young Hala Ahmed (Episode 01-02)

Recurring 
 Saba Hameed as Shahjahan Raees Ahmed, an arrogant woman, Raees's wife; Rifat's niece and daughter-in-law, Raees, Nafees, Jalees and Sofia's cousin; Nafees, Jalees and Sofia's sister-in-law, Hamza and Roomi's mother; Sameen, Hala, Maryam, Musa and Abraham's aunt; Hala's mother-in-law; she creates troubles for Hala as she dislikes her, she had dreamt for Hamza and Sameen's marriage, but the dream stays dream, after Hamza marries Hala, she keeps on trying breaking their relationship, but fails. (2021–2022)
 Waseem Abbas as Raees Ahmad; Rifat's eldest son and head of the family; Shah Jahan's husband; Nafees and Jalees' elder brother; Hamza and Roomi's father; Sameen, Hala, Maryam, Musa and Abraham's uncle; Hala's father-in-law; Sofia's cousin and brother-in-law. He tries to be a single owner of the house after his mother's demise. (2021–2022)
 Tara Mahmood as Sofia Jalees Ahmed, Jalees' wife; Rifat's niece and daughter-in-law, Raees, Nafees, Jalees and ShahJahan's cousin; Nafees, Raees and ShahJahan's sister-in-law, Sameen's mother; Hamza, Roomi, Hala, Maryam, Musa and Abraham's aunt. She had dreamt for Hamza and Sameen's marriage, but the dream is not realised. (2021–2022)
 Amir Qureshi as Jalees Ahmed, a hand-paralysed person who lost a hand while saving a bank during a robbery; Sofia's husband, Sameen's father, Riffat's youngest son, Hamza, Hala, Roomi and Maryam, Abraham, Musa's uncle, Raees and Nafees's younger brother; ShahJahan's cousin and brother-in-law, he supports Hala. (2021–2022)
 Alyy Khan as Nafees Ahmed, Riffat's second elder son, who lives in London with his family leaving Hala in Pakistan in his paternal home as his second wife dislike Hala; Hala, Maryam, Musa and Abraham's father, Raees and Jalees's brother, Hamza, Sameen and Roomi's uncle, Hamza's father-in-law. After learning the situation Hala from his mother before dying, he decides to take her London. (2021–2022)
 Hira Umer as Maryam Nafees Ahmed, Hala's British half-sister; Musa and Abraham's sister, Nafees' daughter; Hamza, Sameen and Roomi's cousin; Riffat's granddaughter; Hamza's sister-in-law; Raees and Jalees' niece; she supports Hala after learning her situation and becomes attracted to her. (2022)
 Zoya Nasir as Sameen Jalees Ahmad, an understanding and topper student; Sofia and Jalees' daughter; Rifat's granddaughter; Raees and Nafees' niece; Hala, Hamza, Maryam, Abraham, Musa and Roomi's cousin. Khurram's ex-fiancée; She had a crush on Hamza from childhood; but is heartbroken after Hamza marries Hala. (2022)
 Hira Khan as Roomi Raees Ahmad/Roomi Waqas, Shahjahan and Raees' daughter; Hamza's sister, Rifat's granddaughter; Hala, Maryam, Musa, Abraham and Sameen's cousin, Hala's sister-in-law, Wakas' girlfriend-turned-secret-wife; Rameez's fiancée. (2022)
 Omer Shahzad as Khurram, Hala's Ex- Boyfriend He Betrayed Hala and Shafaq , Shafaq's cousin and ex-fiancée, Sameen's former fiancée (2022)
 Syeda Iman Zaid as Shafaq, Hala's best friend; Khurram's ex-fiancée and cousin (2022)
 Farah Nadeem as Khurram's mother and Shafaq's aunt (deceased) (2022)
 Samina Ahmad as Riffat Aara Ahmed; the head of the family; Raees, Nafees and Jalees' mother; Shahjahan and Sofia's aunt and mother-in-law; Hamaza, Hala, Maryam, Musa, Abraham, Roomi and Sameen's grandmother; Hala's grandmother-in-law; She supports Hala. She took care of Hala like her mother. (deceased) (2021-2022)

Production 
The project was first announced in August 2021 with the working title of Jhooti. Director Qasim Ali Mureed told to Dawn Images that it's a family story with a love story in the middle of it. The story touches upon contemporary issues and it's all quite relatable. The first look of the series was unveiled on 21 December 2021. The first episode aired on 30 December 2021 on ARY Digital.

References 

2021 Pakistani television series debuts